Historic motorsport or vintage motorsport,  is motorsport with vehicles limited to a particular era. Only safety precautions are modernized in these hobbyist races. A historical event can be of various types of motorsport disciplines, from road racing to rallying.

Events
Some of the most famous events are the Goodwood Festival of Speed and Goodwood Revival in Britain and Monterey Historic in the United States.  Championships range from "grass root" Austin Seven racing to the FIA Thoroughbred Grand Prix Championship for classic Formula One chassis. In Canada, the Vintage Automobile Racing Association of Canada annually hosts the VARAC Vintage Grand Prix at Canadian Tire Motorsport Park (formerly known as Mosport.)

While there are several professional teams and drivers in historical racing, this branch of motorsport tends to be contested by wealthy car owners and is thus more amateur and laid back in its approach. One advantage of historical motorsport is that once a series for a particular category is introduced, it helps to increase the value of its competing cars, sometimes approaching the million dollar mark, therefore as a result, many of these are carefully driven by its owners and are occasionally used to bring in spectators.

Notable historic motorsport events
The list are for events that has run at least three years and are internationally recognised events.

Notable series
Classic Endurance Racing
Historic Formula One Championship
Orwell SuperSports Cup
Historic Ferrari Challenge (formerly Historic Ferrari Maserati Challenge)
GLPpro.de Historic Regularity Racing on Race Tracks

Notable organizations

 
 Classic Endurance Racing (CER)
 Group C Racing Series (formerly Group C GTP Racing)
 Historic Grand Prix Cars Association (HGPCA)
 Masters Historic Racing
 Motor Racing Legends (MRL)

 
 Classic Sports Car Club (CSCC)
 Historic Sports Car Club (HSCC)
 Vintage Motor Cycle Club (VMCC)
 Vintage Sports Car Club (VSCC)

 
 American Historic Racing Motorcycle Association (AHRMA)
 Historic Motor Sports Association (HMSA)
 Historic Sportscar Racing (HSR)
 Sportscar Vintage Racing Association (SVRA)
 Vintage Auto Racing Association (VARA)

 
 Historic Sports and Racing Car Association (HSRCA)

See also
Classic rally
Nostalgia drag racing

References

External links
 Historic racing events calendar
 GLPpro.de, regularity racing series in Germany - Gleichmässigkeitsprüfungen auf Rennstrecken
 International Historic Motoring Awards

Auto racing by type